Monodia may refer to:

 the Mauritanian gerbil, a rodent species sometimes placed in a genus Monodia.
 Monodia (plant), a genus of grasses in the Chloridoideae subfamily.
 monody, a musical composition with a single melodic line or voice (Latin)
 duo monodia, a Swiss musical duo (Harp and Oboe/Englishhorn)
 Monodia (album)